Alexander Stevens may refer to:

 Alexander H. Stephens (1812–1883), American politician
 Alexander Henry Stevens (1834–1916), American banker
 Alexander Hodgdon Stevens (1789–1869), American surgeon
 Alexander Stevens, alias of J. Peters